SMS S16 was a V1-class torpedo boat of the Imperial German Navy. The ship was built by Schichau-Werke, at their Elbing shipyard, completing in 1912. S16 served with the German High Seas Fleet during the First World War, taking part in the Battle of Jutland in 1916. She was sunk by a mine on 20 January 1918.

Construction and design
In 1911, the Imperial German Navy decided to break the pattern of each year's orders of torpedo boats being a development of the previous year's designs, as it felt that they were getting too big to work for the fleet, and instead the 12 torpedo boats (six each ordered from AG Vulcan and Germaniawerft) (the V1-class) were smaller than those ordered in recent years in order to be more manoeuvrable and so work better with the fleet. This change resulted in the numbering series for torpedo boats being restarted. The 1912 programme placed orders for a flotilla of 12 torpedo boats of similar design ( to ) with Schichau-Werke. The reduction in size resulted in the ships' seaworthiness being adversely affected, however, with the 1911 and 1912 torpedo boats acquiring the disparaging nickname "Admiral Lans' cripples".

S16s armament consisted of two  SK L/30 naval guns in single mounts fore and aft, together with four 50 cm (19.7 in) torpedo tubes with one reload torpedo carried. Up to 18 mines could be carried. The ship had a crew of 74 officers and other ranks. In 1916, the guns were replaced by more powerful 8.8 cm SK L/45 naval guns.

S16, yard number 867, was launched at Schichau's shipyard in Elbing, East Prussia (now Elbląg in Poland) on 23 April 1912 and was commissioned on 1 October 1912.

Service
S16 was a member of the 13th Half-flotilla of the 7th Torpedo boat flotilla of the German High Seas Fleet on the outbreak of war. The 7th Torpedo Boat Flotilla supported the Raid on Yarmouth on 3 November 1914 and the Raid on Scarborough, Hartlepool and Whitby on 16 December 1914. On 20 December, S16 reported being unsuccessfully attacked by a submarine off the mouth of the Jade river.

S16, as part of the 7th flotilla, was part of the High Seas Fleet when it sailed to cover the Lowestoft Raid on 24–25  April 1916. At the Battle of Jutland on 31 May–1 June 1916, S16 was still part of the 13th Half-flotilla of the 7th Torpedo boat flotilla, operating in support of the main German battle fleet. During the night action, the 7th flotilla was ordered to search for and attack the British fleet. At about 23:00 hr CET (i.e. 22:00 hr GMT) on the night of 31 May/1 June, there was a brief confrontation between the 7th Torpedo Boat flotilla and the British 4th Destroyer Flotilla. Four German torpedo boats, including S16, each fired one torpedo at the British destroyers, although S16s torpedo misfired and did not correctly launch, while the British ships replied with gunfire, but no ships were damaged and contact was soon lost, although the two formations met again at about 23:42 CET (22:42 GMT) when  fired another torpedo, which also missed.

By late April 1917, the torpedo boats of the 7th Torpedo Boat Flotilla had been fitted for minesweeping and their crews trained in that task, and became increasingly dedicated to minesweeping. On 20 January 1918, S16 was sunk by a mine in the North Sea. 80 men, the whole of her crew, were killed. These losses, together with the auxiliary minesweeper  a few hours earlier, in what was a supposedly a mine-free channel resulted in the route being abandoned and a fresh route swept further to the south.

Notes

References

Bibliography
 
 
 
 
 
 
 
 
 

Torpedo boats of the Imperial German Navy
1912 ships
World War I torpedo boats of Germany
V1-class destroyers